Vivian Hösch (also spelled Hoesch, born 18 March 1991) is a visually impaired German biathlete and cross-country skier.

She competed for Germany at the 2014 Winter Paralympics, where she reached rank 5 in the 5 km cross-country skiing and rank 6 in 6 km biathlon.

References

External links
  
 

1991 births
Living people
German female biathletes
German female cross-country skiers
Paralympic biathletes of Germany
Paralympic cross-country skiers of Germany
Cross-country skiers at the 2014 Winter Paralympics
Biathletes at the 2014 Winter Paralympics
Biathletes at the 2018 Winter Paralympics
21st-century German women